Milana Nagaraj (born 25 April 1989) is an Indian actress who primarily works in Kannada films. Milana made her acting debut with Nam Duniya Nam Style (2013). The same year, she received Filmfare Award for Best Supporting Actress – Kannada nomination, for her performance in Brindavana.

Post a serious of failures, Milana received praises for her portrayal of Nidhima in Love Mocktail (2020) and its sequel Love Mocktail 2 (2022). For the former, she won Filmfare Critics Award for Best Actress – Kannada and SIIMA Award for Best Actress – Kannada. Milana is married to her co-actor Krishna.

Early life and work
Milana was born on 25 April 1989 in Hassan, Karnataka. She completed her schooling in Hassan. She completed her BE in computer science from Vivekananda Institute of Technology, Bengaluru and is a computer engineer. She was a state-level backstroke swimmer, before she started modelling.

Milana started her career as a model and participated in Femina Miss Karnataka, where she won "Miss Best Personality". She then ventured into acting.

Career

Debut and early work (2013-2019)
Milana made her acting  debut with the 2013 film Nam Duniya Nam Style opposite Likith Shetty. Times of India noted "Milana Nagaraj excels with good expressions and dialogue delivery." The same year, she portrayed Madhu opposite Darshan in Brindavana, a remake of Telugu film Brindavanam.  Times of India said that Milana "impresses" with her expressions. In 2015, she portrayed Purvi in Charlie, opposite Krishna. 

Milana has two releases in 2017. She first made her Malayalam film debut with Avarude Raavukal opposite Vinay Forrt. Deccan Chronicle stated, "Milana Nagaraj has done a neat job but seems like an afterthought." She next portrayed Aishwarya in Jani opposite Vijay Raghavendra. Times of India noted that Milana has "bare minimum to do".

Career progression and success (2020-present)
Milana made her film comeback, post a three year hiatus with the 2020 film Love Mocktail. She portrayed Nidhima, software employee opposite Krishna. The New Indian Express stated, "A unique role for Milana Nagaraj, she shows maturity in her acting." The News Minute noted, "Milana Nagaraj has a refreshing character and plays her part well. She must continue to pick roles that bring the best out of her." The same year, she portrayed Spandana in Matte Udbhava opposite Panju. Times of India mentioned that "Milana Nagaraj chips in with a good performance."

Milana had three releases in 2022. She first reprised Nidhima in Love Mocktail 2 opposite Krishna. Deccan Herald mentioned, "Milana's effort is a fine mix of understanding the character and bringing new layers to it." They even termed her "The soul of the franchise".  Times of India stated, "Milana looks ethereal in the film and adds a lot of entertainment." She next portrayed Renu Rona opposite Sudeepa in Vikrant Rona. Bollywood Hungama noted that, "Milana is nice in her cameo role." She then portrayed Nikitha alongside Amrutha Iyengar in O(ಓ). The New Indian Express stated, "Milana get to experiment with fresh characterisation and gives a strong performance."

In 2023, she first portrayed Pallavi opposite Krishna in Mr. Bachelor. Cinema Express mentions that she delivers "a likeable performance". She next portrayed a fashion designer in Love Birds opposite Krishna. The New Indian Express said, "Milana gives a natural and poignant performance." While Times of India wrote, "Krishna and Milana impress with their performance as a couple that is very much in love, but are unable to see through their differences." 

Milana will next appear in For Regn opposite Pruthvi Ambaar and in Araam Aravind Swamy opposite Anish Tejeshwar and Abhishek Shetty.

Personal life
Milana Nagaraj met actor Krishna, on the sets of the 2013 film Nam Duniya Nam Style. They eventually started dating in 2015. Nagaraj married Krishna on 14 February 2021, in a private traditional ceremony on the outskirts of Bengaluru.

Other work and media image 
Milana turned producer alongside Krishna in 2020. She has co-produced Love Mocktail (2020) and Love Mocktail 2 (2022). She won SIIMA Award for Best Film – Kannada for the former.

Milana ranked 14th in Bangalore Times' 30 Most Desirable Women list of 2020.

Filmography

Films

All films are in Kannada unless otherwise noted.

Other crew positions

Accolades

See also
List of Kannada film actresses

References

External links
 

21st-century Indian actresses
Indian film actresses
Living people
Actresses in Kannada cinema
Kannada actresses
Actresses from Bangalore
Actresses in Malayalam cinema
People from Hassan district
Year of birth missing (living people)